Competition of Paso Horses in Trujillo is a contest held in Trujillo city located at northern Peru. These competitions organized by the Association of Breeders and Owners of Paso Horses in La Libertad have as principal participants to the traditional Chalanes (riders) and Peruvian Paso horses in the city are celebrated annually. The care and training of Paso horses in this place is a very old tradition. Trujillo is known and considered as the Cradle of the typical Peruvian Paso Horse as well as the Capital of Culture of Peru so as the Capital of the Marinera dance, which is one of the most important cultural symbols in Peru.

Organization

In the city the contests of Paso Horses are organized by the Association of Breeders and Owners of Paso Horses in La Libertad, the best known and most important are The National Competition Paso Horses being done within the framework of the International Spring Festival made between September and October and in the Festival and International Competition of Marinera in January. Peruvian government has declared this kind of horses as Nation's cultural heritage.

Principal competitions

Peruvian paso in Marinera festival
This competition is held during the Trujillo Marinera Festival in January of every year.

Peruvian Paso in Spring festival
During Trujillo Spring Festival in September and October of every year is celebrated a Peruvian Paso contest with the presence of horses from several regions of Peru.

Gallery

See also
 San Jose Festival
 Trujillo Book Festival
 International Festival of Lyric Singing
 Trujillo
 Santiago de Huamán
 Victor Larco Herrera District

References

External links

 Map of Trujillo city

Festivals in Trujillo, Peru